Here is a Singaporean film released in 2009, written and directed by Ho Tzu Nyen. The film was selected for screening at the 41st Directors Fortnight section at the Cannes Film Festival and was also nominated for Golden Kinnaree Award in 2009.

Synopsis
Here follows the journey of a man who struggles to make sense of his reality. Reeling from the sudden death of his wife, he loses the will to speak and is interned at Island Hospital. There, he meets strident kleptomaniac Beatrice with whom he forms an inexplicable bond. As the man adjusts to life within, he is selected for an experimental treatment, which forces him to confront the devastating truth behind his past, present, and future.

Cast
 John Low as H
 Jo Tan as B
 Hemang Yadav as Freddie
 George Kuruvilla as Editor

References

External links
 
 

2009 films
Singaporean drama films
2000s Mandarin-language films
2000s English-language films